The position of Savilian Professor of Geometry  was established at the University of Oxford in 1619. It was founded (at the same time as the Savilian Professorship of Astronomy) by Sir Henry Savile, a mathematician and classical scholar who was Warden of Merton College, Oxford, and Provost of Eton College, reacting to what has been described by one 20th-century mathematician as "the wretched state of mathematical studies in England" at that time. He appointed Henry Briggs as the first professor. Edward Titchmarsh (professor 1931–63) said when applying that he was not prepared to lecture on geometry, and the requirement was removed from the duties of the post to enable his appointment, although the title of the chair was not changed. The two Savilian chairs have been linked with professorial fellowships at New College, Oxford, since the late 19th century. Before then, for over 175 years until the middle of the 19th century, the geometry professors had an official residence adjoining the college in New College Lane.

There have been 20 professors; Frances Kirwan, the current and first female holder of the chair, was appointed in 2017. The post has been held by a number of distinguished mathematicians. Briggs helped to develop the common logarithm, described as "one of the most useful systems for mathematics". Both Edmond Halley, who successfully predicted the return of the comet named in his honour, and his successor Nathaniel Bliss held the post of Astronomer Royal in addition to the professorship. Stephen Rigaud (professor 1810–27) has been called "the foremost historian of astronomy and mathematics in his generation". The life and work of James Sylvester (professor 1883–94) was commemorated by the Royal Society by the inauguration of the Sylvester Medal; this was won by a later professor, Edward Titchmarsh. Two professors, Sylvester and Michael Atiyah (professor 1963–69), have been awarded the Copley Medal of the Royal Society; Atiyah also won the Fields Medal while he was professor.

Foundation and duties
Sir Henry Savile, the Warden of Merton College, Oxford, and Provost of Eton College, was deeply saddened by what the 20th-century mathematician Ida Busbridge has termed "the wretched state of mathematical studies in England", and so founded professorships in geometry and astronomy at the University of Oxford in 1619; both chairs were named after him. He also donated his books to the university's Bodleian Library "for the use chiefly of mathematical readers". He required the professors to be men of good character, at least 26 years old, and to have "imbibed the purer philosophy from the springs of Aristotle and Plato" before acquiring a thorough knowledge of science. The professors could come from any Christian country, but he specified that a professor from England should have a Master of Arts degree as a minimum. He wanted students to be educated in the works of the leading scientists of the ancient world, saying that the professor of geometry should teach Euclid's Elements, Apollonius's Conics, and the works of Archimedes; tuition in trigonometry was to be shared by the two professors.  As many students would have had little mathematical knowledge, the professors were also permitted to provide instruction in basic mathematics in English (as opposed to Latin, the language used in education at Oxford at the time).

Appointment
Savile's first choice for the professorship of geometry was Edmund Gunter, Professor of Astronomy at Gresham College, London. It was reported that Gunter demonstrated the use of his sector and quadrant, but Savile regarded this as "showing of tricks" rather than geometry, and instead appointed Henry Briggs, the Gresham Professor of Geometry, in 1619. Briggs took up the chair in 1620 at an annual salary of £150 and thus became the first person to hold the first two mathematical chairs established in Britain.

Savile reserved to himself the right to appoint the professors during his lifetime.  After his death, he provided that vacancies should be filled by a majority of a group of "most distinguished persons": the Archbishop of Canterbury, the Lord Chancellor, the Chancellor of the university, the Bishop of London, the Secretary of State, the Chief Justice of the Common Pleas, the Chief Justice of the King's Bench, the Chief Baron of the Exchequer and the Dean of the Court of Arches. The Vice-Chancellor of the university was to inform the electors of any vacancy, and could be summoned to advise them.  The appointment could either be made straight away, or delayed for some months to see whether "any eminent mathematician can be allured" from abroad.

As part of reforms of the university in the 19th century, the University of Oxford commissioners laid down new statutes for the chair in 1881. The professor was to "lecture and give instruction in pure and analytical Geometry", and was to be a Fellow of New College. The electors for the professorship were to be the Warden of New College (or a person nominated by the college in his place), the Chancellor of the University of Oxford, the President of the Royal Society, the Sedleian Professor of Natural Philosophy at Oxford, the Sadleirian Professor of Pure Mathematics at the University of Cambridge, a person nominated by the university council and one other nominated by New College. Edward Titchmarsh (professor from 1931 to 1963) said when applying that he was not prepared to lecture on geometry, and the requirement was removed from the duties of the professor to enable his appointment, although the title of the chair was not changed. Changes to the university's internal legislation in the 20th and early 21st centuries abolished specific statutes for the duties of, and rules for appointment to, individual chairs such as the Savilian professorships. The University Council is now empowered to make appropriate arrangements for appointments and conditions of service, with the college to which any professorship is allocated (New College in the case of the Savilian chairs) to have two representatives on the board of electors.

Professors' house

John Wallis (professor 1649–1703) rented a house from New College on New College Lane from 1672 until his death in 1703; at some point, it was divided into two houses.  Towards the end of his life, David Gregory (the Savilian Professor of Astronomy) lived in the eastern part of the premises: although no lease between Wallis and Gregory survives (if one was ever made between the two friends), Gregory's name appears for the first time in the parish rate-book of 1701.  Wallis's son gave the unexpired portion of the lease to the university in 1704 in honour of his father's long tenure of the chair, to provide official residences for the two Savilian professors. New College renewed the lease at a low rent from 1716 and thereafter at intervals until the last renewal in 1814. Records of who lived in each house are not available throughout the period, but surviving documentation shows that the professors often sub-let the houses and for about twenty years in the early 18th century the premises were being used as a lodging house. Stephen Rigaud lived there from 1810 until he became the astronomy professor in 1827; thereafter, Baden Powell lived there with his family.  The geometry professors were associated with the houses for longer than the astronomy professors: when the Radcliffe Observatory was built in the 1770s, the post of Radcliffe Observer was coupled to the astronomy professorship, and they were provided with a house in that role; thereafter, the university sublet the astronomy professor's house itself.  In the early 19th century, New College decided that it wished to use the properties for itself and the lease expired in 1854.

List of professors

See also
Gresham Professor of Geometry
List of professorships at the University of Oxford

Notes

References

 
Professorships at the University of Oxford
Professorships in mathematics
1619 establishments in England
Lists of people associated with the University of Oxford
New College, Oxford
Mathematics education in the United Kingdom